North Elmsall is a civil parish in the metropolitan borough of the City of Wakefield, West Yorkshire, England.  The parish contains eight listed buildings that are recorded in the National Heritage List for England.  All the listed buildings are designated at Grade II, the lowest of the three grades, which is applied to "buildings of national importance and special interest".  The parish contains the village of North Elmsall and the surrounding countryside.  Most of the listed buildings are houses and associated structures, farmhouses and farm buildings, and the others consist of a church and a milepost.


Buildings

References

Citations

Sources

 

Lists of listed buildings in West Yorkshire